are Japanese playing cards. Playing cards were introduced to Japan by Portuguese traders during the mid-16th century. These early decks were used for trick-taking games. The earliest indigenous karuta was invented in the town of Miike in Chikugo Province at around the end of the 16th century. The Miike karuta Memorial Hall located in Ōmuta, Fukuoka, is the only municipal museum in Japan dedicated specifically to the history of karuta.

Karuta packs are classified into two groups, those that are descended from Portuguese cards and those from e-awase. E-awase originally derived from kai-awase, which was played with shells but were converted to card format during the early 17th century. The basic idea of any e-awase karuta game is to be able to quickly determine which card out of an array of cards is required and then to grab the card before it is grabbed by an opponent. It is often played by children at elementary school and junior high-school level during class, as an educational exercise.

Portuguese-derived karuta

Komatsufuda

The first indigenous Japanese deck was the Tenshō karuta named after the Tenshō period (1573–92). It was a 48 card deck with the 10s missing like Portuguese decks from that period. It kept the four Latin suits of cups, coins, clubs, and swords along with the three face cards of female knave, knight, and king.  In 1633, the Tokugawa shogunate banned these cards, forcing Japanese manufacturers to radically redesign their cards.  As a result of Japan's isolationist Sakoku policy, karuta would develop separately from the rest of the world. In order to evade the proscription of Portuguese derived cards, makers turned the cards into very abstract designs known as mekuri karuta. By the mid-20th century, all mekuri karuta fell into oblivion with the exception of Komatsufuda which is used to play Kakkuri, a game similar to Poch, found in Yafune, Fukui prefecture.

Unsun karuta

The Unsun karuta deck developed in the late 17th century.  It has five suits of 15 ranks each for a total of 75 cards.  Six of the ranks were face cards.  The Portuguese deck used to have dragons on their aces; the Unsun karuta made the aces and dragons separate cards. The order of the court cards change depending on whether it is the trump suit or not just like in Ombre. The new Guru suit used circular whirls (mitsudomoe) as pips. Unsun karuta is still used in Hitoyoshi, Kumamoto, to play hachinin-meri, a game descended from Guritipau, a relative of Ombre. This game preserves some very archaic features such as inverted ranking for the pip cards in the three round suits. Inverted ranking is a feature found in Madiao, Khanhoo, Tổ tôm, Ganjifa, Tarot, Ombre, and Maw and is believed to have originated in the very earliest card games.

Kabufuda

Kabufuda is another derivative of mekuri karuta but all the suits were made identical. It is used for gambling games such as Oicho-Kabu. They come in decks of 40 cards with designs representing the numbers 1 through 10.  There are four cards for each number and the 10 (Jack) is the only face card.

Harifuda and Hikifuda
The gambling game of Tehonbiki can be played with either a Harifuda or Hikifuda set. Harifuda contains seven copies of cards numbered one to six in stylized Chinese numerals for a total of 42 cards. The 48-card Hikifuda or Mamefuda has eight copies of cards with one to six coins, similar to the coins of a mekuri karuta set. In Tehonbiki, the player tries to guess which number from 1 to 6 the dealer has selected. Some sets may include indicator cards to raise or hedge bets.

Hanafuda 

Hanafuda (Japanese: , lit. flower cards, also called Hanakaruta) are 48 card decks with flower designs originating from the early 19th century. Instead of being divided by 4 suits with 12 cards each, a hanafuda deck is divided by 12 suits (months) with 4 cards each. Hanafuda games are mostly fishing games.

E-awase karuta

Uta-garuta

Uta-garuta (lit. "poetry karuta") is a card game in which 100 waka poems are written on two sets of 100 cards: one set is yomifuda (lit. "reading cards"), which have the complete poem taken from the Ogura Hyakunin Isshu, and the other is torifuda (lit. "grabbing cards"), which each correspond to a yomifuda and have only the last few lines of the corresponding poem on them. One person is chosen to be the reader. As the reader reads a yomifuda, the players race to find its associated torifuda before anybody else does. This game has traditionally been played on New Year's Day since 1904. Competitive karuta has competitions on various levels with the Japan national championship tournament being held every January at Omi shrine (a Shinto shrine) in Ōtsu, Shiga since 1955.

A few non-matching games exist that use only the yomifuda. Bouzu Mekuri, is a simple game of chance originating from the Meiji period. Iro Kammuri (Color Crowns) is a 4-player partnership game that is related to Goita. In both games, the poems are irrelevant, and the only parts of the cards that matter are the appearance of the poets such as their clothing, sex, or social status.

Ita-karuta
Ita-karuta is a variation found in Hokkaido. The torifuda are made of wood while the yomifuda remain the same or lack illustrations of the poets. They are used to play a competitive partnership game called shimo-no ku karuta in which the last half of the poem is read.

Iroha karuta
Iroha karuta is an easier-to-understand matching game for children, similar to Uta-garuta but with 96 cards. Instead of poems, the cards represent the 47 syllables of the hiragana syllabary and adds kyō ("capital") for the 48th (since the syllable -n  can never start any word or phrase). It uses the old iroha ordering for the syllables which includes two obsolete syllables, wi and we. A typical torifuda features a drawing with a kana at one corner of the card. Its corresponding yomifuda features a proverb connected to the picture with the first syllable being the kana displayed on the torifuda. There are 3 standard Iroha karuta variants: Kamigata, Edo and Owari. Each variant has its own set of proverbs based on the local dialect and culture. The Kamigata or Kyoto version is the oldest but the Edo version is the most widespread, being found all over Japan. The Owari variant existed only during the latter half of the 19th-century before being supplanted by the Edo version.

Obake karuta

Obake karuta is an obsolete variation of Iroha karuta unique to Tokyo. The cards were created in the Edo period and remained popular through the 1910s or 1920s. Each card in the deck features a hiragana syllable and a creature from Japanese mythology; in fact, obake karuta means ghost cards or monster cards. Success requires knowledge of Japanese mythology and folklore as players attempt to collect cards that match clues read by a referee. The player who accumulates the most cards by the end of the game wins.

Obake karuta is an early example of the common Japanese fascination with classifying monsters and creating new ones. The game is one of the earliest attempts by Japanese companies to categorize legendary creatures, label them, define them, and subsequently market them. As such, it is a precursor to the Godzilla films of the 1950s and later. Even more closely, obake karuta resembles the Yu-Gi-Oh! or Pokémon Trading Card Game, which also involves collecting cards that represent fabulous creatures. In fact, many Pokémon were designed specifically after creatures from Japanese mythology.

Jomo karuta 
Jomo karuta (上毛かるた, じょうもうかるた) is a regional variation of the popular Japanese card game karuta and contains 44 cards featuring famous people, places, and history from Japan's Gunma Prefecture. 'Jomo' is an old name for Gunma. The first edition of Jomo karuta was printed in 1947.

Overview 
Every year Gunma Prefecture holds a Jomo karuta competition. Preliminaries take place in January, encouraging local children to take advantage of winter vacation to practice. Then the final competition is held in February. It is not uncommon for people who spent their childhoods in Gunma to have all the cards memorized by heart. In fact, as adults they often realize that Gunma citizens are the only ones who know so much about their own birthplace.

Among the 44 cards, only the "chi" card changes slightly depending on the era. That is because it is representative of the population of Gunma, so as the number of people living in the prefecture changes, so does the number shown on the card. As of the 1947 census, the population stood at 1,570,027 people compared to 1,600,000 recorded in the very first edition of Jomo karuta. In 1993 the population grew to over 2 million people. Fans of Jomo karuta are able to guess one's approximate age based on the version of the "chi" card one has memorized.

In 1998, the Gunma Culture Association released an official English edition. However, on October 28, 2013, the rights to English Jomo karuta were handed over to Gunma Prefecture.  Nowadays there are several events that utilize the game; in February 2013 the first national King of JMK tournament was established, giving adults the opportunity to participate in a Jomo karuta competition as well.

History 
Masahiko Urano, a native of Gunma, returned to his hometown from what is present day Mongolia after Japan's defeat in World War 2. Urano felt compelled to help the many orphans and widows affected by the war and began working to support them. Under orders of The Supreme Commander of the Allied Powers, schools had stopped teaching geography and history. Urano, who loved Gunma dearly, wanted the children to take pride in their local history and culture.

It was under those circumstances that on July 15, 1946, Urano met Seiki Suda, a devout Christian priest, at a conference in neighboring city Annaka. Together, Urano and Suda came up with the idea of promoting Gunma's history and culture through the game of karuta. On January 11, 1947, The Jomo Shimbun newspaper ran an ad announcing the concept and asked for submissions for possible card ideas. A committee of 18 local historians and figures of cultural importance were gathered to select the winning 44 cards as well as design the artwork and content of each one. 12,000 copies were sold during the initial release. The first annual Jomo karuta competition was then held in 1948.

An official English version was first released in 1994, followed with a re-release in 2020.

Cards 
Because the purpose of the game was to teach children about the history and culture of Gunma, each card represents something or someone of local importance. On the front of each yomifuda (the card that is read aloud) is a short proverb related to the card's topic, and on the back is a longer description of its significance.

There were many historical figures whose names were submitted for possible card entries, and most are still used to this day. However, the Supreme Commander for the Allied Powers took issue with several of the cards, citing that the people featured had had problematic philosophies and criminal backgrounds. Those same cards were subsequently discarded from the game.

Main cities located throughout Gunma are featured, as well as famous nature and sightseeing spots around the Prefecture. Cities include Maebashi, Takasaki, Kiryu, Isesaki, and Ota. In addition, Gunma's three famous mountains (Mt. Akagi, Mt. Haruna, and Mt. Myogi), nationally famous onsen (Kusatsu, Ikaho, and Shima), and local shrines and specialty food products are also included.

Card list

Official rules 
In tournaments, there are options to play singles or in teams of three.

Set up 
Players sit on the floor facing each other and do a quick bout of rock-paper-scissors; when playing in teams, the person sitting in the middle is the one who does rock-paper-scissors. The winning side is responsible for shuffling the deck and splitting the torifuda cards into two sets of 22. The losing side gets to choose which set they want and the winning side takes the other. Each team will spread their 22 cards on the floor. When playing one-on-one cards are set in tiers of 3 (when playing as a team, cards are set in tiers of 2), with all the cards being spread out evenly. Both teams place the final card on either their left or right.

There should be 3 centimeters of space between the two teams, and each tier of cards should be spaced 1 centimeter apart. The cards should be placed at least 20 centimeters away from the players' kneecaps. Players are allowed to strategize about the order they place down their cards. When playing in teams, all members should have an equal number of cards by the end of the match.

The referee will give a signal 3 minutes before the start of the match. During this time players are free to set up their cards on the floor and strategize together. The referee will give another signal 1 minute before the match begins; after that, players are not allowed to touch the cards until the official start. During this time players memorize the cards' locations to make it easier to grab them during the match.

How to play 
The person reading the yomifuda cards must read the 'tsu' card ("Shaped like a flying crane, Gunma Prefecture") twice. This officially allows the match to begin. Players should not grab the 'tsu' card during this time. From then on, the reader will always read each card twice. This allows the referee time to intervene should there be any disputes over who grabbed the torifuda card first, as well as grant a cool down period before the next card is drawn. The first reading is considered the "real" one and read in a higher tone of voice, while the second reading is done in a lower voice. Players may grab the card before the reader has finished the first reading.

The first player to touch the picture torifuda card gets to keep it. It does not matter if the card gets flipped, blown away, or pulled; however, players are not allowed to use both hands or keep their hand down near the cards. The unused hand cannot stick out past the player's knees. Players also cannot put their other hand on their laps until after the card reader begins reading. If any players touch a card that was not read, they must give one of their cards to their opponent as a penalty.

When there are only two cards remaining, they need to be lined up side by side, with 30 centimeters of space between them. After the second reading (which should be one of the two remaining cards), players may try and take the card. Whoever succeeds is given the last remaining card as a bonus; therefore, the last card is not read aloud. When playing in teams, the players sitting in the middle are the ones who try and grab the final cards.

Scoring 
The scoring system is different for single and team matches. In the former, the player with the most cards in hand simply wins. In the latter, the score is calculated first at one point for each card the player has in his or her hand. Then, the same cards get awarded extra points based on a special scale seen below. The team with the highest total score wins. In the event of a tie, the player or team who holds the 'tsu' card becomes the winner. This means that the 'tsu' card is the most important card in the game, so players will need to move quickly if they want to be able to snag it.

Special scoring scale
In team matches it is beneficial to gather specific card combinations. The special scale awards points as seen below: Note that this scale does not apply during single matches.

Elementary school players can only use the 5 Cities and/or the 3 Mountains combinations whereas junior high school players can use any of the three.

See also
 Goita
 Menko
 Competitive karuta

References and notes

External links

 Japanese playing cards of western origin: Portuguese-derived patterns.
 Andy's Playing Cards: Portuguese derived cards: An in-depth look at Portuguese-derived patterns.
 Andy's Playing Cards: E-awase playing cards (archived): E-awase type cards.
 Japanese Traditional Games: Card Games
 Edo Karuta Research Center (archived)

Japanese card games